Kian is a city in Chaharmahal and Bakhtiari Province, Iran.

Kian may also refer to:

Kian, Isfahan, a village in Isfahan Province, Iran
Kian, Khuzestan, a village in Khuzestan Province, Iran
Kian, Babol, a village in Mazandaran Province, Iran
Kian (given name), an English and Persian given name
Kian F.C., a football club based in Teheran, Iran, later renamed
Kian (bull), red Holstein breeding bull
Kian (musician), an Australian singer-songwriter
Kian (tea master), a tea master of Ryukyu Kingdom
Ji'an, China, formerly romanized as Kian

See also
Cian, a figure in Irish mythology
Cian (name) Irish given name
Kyan (name)
Kiyan (disambiguation)
Kayanian dynasty
Kian Baraftab, a village in Lorestan Province, Iran
Kian-e Nesar, a village in Lorestan Province
Sarab-e Kian, a village in Lorestan Province
Giyan, a city in Hamadan Province, Iran